Miatta Nema Fahnbulleh (born September 1979) is a Liberian-born British economist who is the Chief Executive at the New Economics Foundation.

Early life and education
Born in Liberia to a Liberian father and a Sierra-Leonean mother, Fahnbulleh and her brother Gamal fled with their family to the UK in 1986 at the onset of the First Liberian Civil War where they applied for asylum.

Fahnbulleh attended Beechwood Sacred Heart School, an independent school in Tunbridge Wells. After studying at Lincoln College, Oxford, she graduated in 2000 with a Bachelor of Arts degree in PPE and obtained a Ph.D. in Economic Development in 2005 from the London School of Economics.

Fahnbulleh wrote her dissertation on the adoption of and success of industrial policy in Ghana and Kenya.

Career
Fahnbulleh was the Head of Cities in the policy unit at the Cabinet Office from 2011 to 2013; the director of policy and research at the IPPR from December 2016 to November 2017; and since November 2017, she has been the Chief Executive of the New Economics Foundation.

On 22 May 2022, Fahnbulleh was announced as a recipient of the MotheRED grant, which will provide funding for mothers to stand as parliamentary candidates for the Labour Party. In September 2022, it was announced that she is standing to be the prospective parliamentary candidate in Camberwell and Peckham at the next general election. The constituency will be an open seat, as Harriet Harman is standing down after 40 years as MP. On 19 November 2022, she was selected as the candidate.

Personal life
Fahnbulleh has three children.

References

External links
 Miatta Fahnbulleh on Twitter

Place of birth missing (living people)
Living people
British people of Liberian descent
Black British women academics
British women economists
Liberian economists
Alumni of the London School of Economics
Alumni of the University of Oxford
People from Royal Tunbridge Wells
People educated at Beechwood Sacred Heart School
1979 births
Labour Party (UK) people
Black British women politicians